Pet Projects: The Brian Wilson Productions is a CD compilation album of the recorded work of record producer, songwriter, and musician Brian Wilson as he attempted to branch away from his band the Beach Boys during the early-to-mid-1960s and early 1970s. The compilation features performing artists such as Glen Campbell, Gary Usher, the Honeys, American Spring, Jan and Dean, Sharon Marie, and the Survivors. It was released with a full-color 20-page booklet with rare photos and a detailed essay.

The compilation is the only one of its kind to be released under internationally legitimate circumstances. Previously, Still I Dream of it: Rare Works of Brian Wilson was a similarly-themed grey area Japanese release now considered by law as a bootleg. The issue of legality is also prominent on Pet Projects; some tracks were evidently unavailable due to contractual reasons. Noted absences include Bob & Sheri's "The Surfer Moon" & "Humpty Dumpty", the Castells' "I Do", the Honeys' "The Love of a Boy and a Girl", Bob & Bobby's "Twelve-O-Four" & "Baby What You Want Me To Do", and Ron Wilson's "I'll Keep on Loving You" & "As Tears Go By".

Track list

References

External links

2003 compilation albums
Ace Records (United Kingdom) compilation albums
Albums produced by Brian Wilson
Brian Wilson compilation albums